Rosanna Giel Ramos (born 10 June 1992) is a retired Cuban female volleyball player. She was part of the Cuba women's national volleyball team.

She participated at the 2010 FIVB Volleyball Women's World Championship in Japan. She played with Ciego de Ávila.

Clubs
  Ciego de Ávila (2010)

Le Cannet volleyball, Francia (2016-2017) and (2017-2018)

References

1992 births
Living people
Cuban women's volleyball players
Place of birth missing (living people)
Volleyball players at the 2011 Pan American Games
Pan American Games silver medalists for Cuba
Pan American Games medalists in volleyball
Middle blockers
Medalists at the 2011 Pan American Games
20th-century Cuban women
20th-century Cuban people
21st-century Cuban women